Jaffarabad is a village located in Gilgit District of Gilgit-Baltistan, in Pakistan.  Gilgit city is 36 km (23 mi) away from Jaffarabad.

References 

Populated places in Gilgit District